The women's team recurve competition at the 2007 World Archery Championships took place from July 2007 in Leipzig, Germany. 38 teams of 3 archers took part in the women's recurve qualification round, and the 16 teams with the highest cumulative totals qualified for the 4-round knockout round, drawn according to their qualification round scores. The semi-finals and finals then took place on 14 July.

Seeds
Seedings were based on the combined total of the team members' qualification scores in the individual ranking rounds. The top 16 teams were assigned places in the draw depending on their overall ranking.

Draw

References

2007 World Archery Championships
World